Damion Hudson (born January 11, 1984), better known by his stage name Pennjamin Bannekar is an American independent music artist and songwriter.

Music career
Pennjamin Bannekar was born in Grand Rapids, Michigan but raised in Chicago, Penn as he is often called, discovered his love for music at an early age.  Falling in love with the creative process and writing Penn decided to major in Communications and graduated from University of Illinois Champaign Urbana. College was where Penn began to grow as an artist and started to receive acclaim. Penn came back to Chicago and joined the group Project: Fr3sh. While in Project: Fr3sh Penn changed his name from Penn the God to Pennjamin Bannekar. Given the name by his friends as a joke, he began to love the meaning behind it and chose to use it as his stage name.  After a 2-year run with the group Penn went solo and began to become the unsung hype of Chicago’s hip hop scene. His first solo project was his mixtape Hello World. The release of Hello World had many people clamoring for more  The success of Hello World set up the release of his first album HeartBeat. HeartBeat was released May 3, 2011. The first single from HeartBeat was ILLwrite. The single was a great introduction of who he was and was picked up by MTV  HeartBeat went on to Be named Album Of The Month by some critics  after landing write ups in the Chicago Tribune and touring with Dwele Elzhi Bilal Oliver KRS-One<Penn’s success started to materialize.

Discography

Singles
2016: Maybe featuring Tooty
2016: Bodies featuring Dhniera Blu
2016: Congratulations
2015: Light It Up
2015: Likes
2015: Thief featuring Felly the Voice
2015: Word
2014: ArtOfficial
2014: Never Go Against B
2013: ILLwrite Too
2013: Same Ol Love Song
2011: Counterfeit 
2011: ILLwrite 
2010: Set It Off 
2009: Hello World 
2009: Love As Completion

Albums
2018: 1/11
2015: Paper Plane Pilots
2011: HeartBeat

References

External links 
Official Site
on Facebook

1984 births
Living people
African-American male rappers
American male rappers
American hip hop singers
21st-century American rappers
21st-century American male musicians
21st-century African-American musicians
20th-century African-American people